Dođite na show! (English: Come to the Show!) is a Serbian TV programme produced by RTV Studios in Novi Sad.

Presenter: Stevo Tibai
Assistant producers: Jovan Adamov, Vedran Božić
Executive producer: Vladimir Mihaljek-Miha
Photography: Vican Vicanović i Aljoša Milačić
Graphic Design: Milenko Miletić, akademski slikar
Reviews: Đorđe Debač
Editor: Dragiša Petković

Serbian television series
Television shows set in Serbia
Television shows filmed in Serbia
Radio Television of Serbia original programming